Festuca altissima, also known as the wood fescue, is a species of flowering plant belonging to the family Poaceae.

Its native range is  Europe to Siberia and Iran.

References

altissima